Carlos Mario Quintanar Rohana (2 June 1937 – 14 October 2010) was a Mexican basketball player from Chihuahua who was the Captain of the Mexico national team in the 1960 Summer Olympics, the 1964 Summer Olympics, and the 1968 Summer Olympics.

He also competed in 4 World Championships: Chile 1959, Brazil 1963, Uruguay 1967, and Yugoslavia 1970; and represented Mexico in 4 Pan American Games: Chicago 1959, Sāo Paulo 1963, Winnipeg 1967, and Cali 1971

Carlos Quintanar was nicknamed "Aguja", "Pistolitas" and "The Yokohama Sensation" after being the Most Valuable Player of the 1964 Pre-Olympics, held in Yokohama, Japan. "Aguja" Quintanar is considered to be the greatest Mexican player ever to step into the court.

He won the silver medal in the 1967 Pan American Games in Winnipeg, Manitoba, Canada losing in the finals against the U.S.A. led by Jo Jo White and Wes Unseld

Quintanar is the second Mexican to be drafted by a National Basketball Association team (after his Olympic teammate Manuel Raga); he was drafted in 1971 by the San Diego Rockets in the 18th round (234th overall pick) of that year's NBA draft (his surname was misspelled Quintar). However, he never played professionally to maintain his amateur status.

References

External links

1939 births
2010 deaths
Mexican men's basketball players
1959 FIBA World Championship players
1963 FIBA World Championship players
1967 FIBA World Championship players
Basketball players from Chihuahua
Sportspeople from Ciudad Juárez
Olympic basketball players of Mexico
Basketball players at the 1960 Summer Olympics
Basketball players at the 1964 Summer Olympics
Basketball players at the 1968 Summer Olympics
Basketball players at the 1959 Pan American Games
Basketball players at the 1963 Pan American Games
Basketball players at the 1967 Pan American Games
Basketball players at the 1971 Pan American Games
San Diego Rockets draft picks
Pan American Games medalists in basketball
Pan American Games silver medalists for Mexico
Medalists at the 1967 Pan American Games